The 2003 Men's South American Volleyball Championship was the 25th edition of the event, organised by South America's governing volleyball body, the Confederación Sudamericana de Voleibol (CSV). It was hosted in Rio de Janeiro, Brazil from September 2 to September 6, 2003.

Preliminary round robin
Tuesday 2003-09-02

Wednesday 2003-09-03

Thursday 2003-09-04

Friday 2003-09-05

Saturday 2003-09-06

Final ranking

Individual awards

References
 Results

Men's South American Volleyball Championships
S
Volleyball
V
2003 in South American sport
September 2003 sports events in South America